María del Carmen Escudero Fabre (born 25 July 1969) is a Mexican politician affiliated with the National Action Party. As of 2014 she served as Deputy of the LIX Legislature of the Mexican Congress as a plurinominal representative.

References

1969 births
Living people
Politicians from Veracruz
Women members of the Chamber of Deputies (Mexico)
Members of the Chamber of Deputies (Mexico)
National Action Party (Mexico) politicians
Deputies of the LIX Legislature of Mexico